Paul McFarland (born December 6, 1985 in Richmond Hill, Ontario) is a Canadian former ice hockey player and coach who is currently an assistant coach with the Seattle Kraken in the National Hockey League (NHL).

Playing career

Junior hockey

Kitchener Rangers (2001–2005)
McFarland was drafted by the Kitchener Rangers in the 10th round, 184th overall, during the 2001 OHL Priority Selection. During the 2001–02 season, McFarland played with the Pickering Panthers of the OPJHL, where in 48 games, he scored 13 goals and 38 points.

He joined the Rangers for the 2002–03 season. On September 20, 2002, McFarland made his OHL debut, as he was held to no points in a 5–0 loss to the Windsor Spitfires. On October 11, McFarland scored his first career OHL goal and point, as he scored a third period goal against Max Marion of the Erie Otters in a 9–1 victory. On January 24, McFarland earned his first career multi-point game of his OHL career, as he scored a goal and an assist in an 11–2 win. In 58 games, McFarland scored five goals and 17 points. On March 21, McFarland played in his first career post-season game as the Rangers defeated the Sault Ste. Marie Greyhounds 3–0. In 12 playoff games, McFarland had no points, as the Rangers won the J. Ross Robertson Cup and qualifying for the 2003 Memorial Cup. McFarland did not see any game action during the Memorial Cup, however, the Rangers won the championship, defeating the Hull Olympiques 6–3 in the final game.

McFarland returned to the Rangers for the 2003–04 season. In 59 games with the Rangers, McFarland scored 12 goals and 34 points. He suffered a late-season injury, and was limited to only one post-season game, where he was held to no points. Following the season, McFarland won the Herchenrader Family Award, which is given to the Rangers player with the Best Defensive Ability.

In 2004–05, McFarland returned to Kitchener for a third season. In 39 games with the Rangers, McFarland scored eight goals and 14 points. On January 9, 2005, the Rangers traded McFarland and a sixth round draft pick to the Windsor Spitfires for Ryan Donally.

Windsor Spitfires (2004–2006)
McFarland joined the Windsor Spitfires to finish the 2004–05 season, following a mid-season trade from the Kitchener Rangers. On January 13, 2005, McFarland played in his first game with Windsor, as he scored a goal against Ryan Nie of the Plymouth Whalers in a 5–2 victory. In 26 games with the Spitfires, McFarland scored three goals and 11 points. On March 31, McFarland played in his first playoff game with the Spitfires, and earned his first career playoff point, as he assisted on the overtime winning goal scored by Steve Downie, in a 4–3 win over the Sault Ste. Marie Greyhounds. In 11 playoff games, McFarland earned two assists.

In 2005–06, McFarland was named captain of the club. On October 8, McFarland scored the first multi-goal game of his career, scoring two goals against the Plymouth Whalers in a 6–5 loss. On October 27, McFarland set a career-high for points in a game, as he scored two goals and added an assist for three points, in a 6–4 win over the London Knights. On November 5, McFarland scored his first career hat trick, and added two assists, for a new career-high of five points in a game, as the Spitfires defeated the Saginaw Spirit 8–2. In 65 games during the regular season, McFarland set career highs in goals with 22, and points with 37. On April 2, 2006, McFarland scored his first career post-season goal, as he scored the game-winning goal against Justin Peters in a 7–4 win over the Plymouth Whalers. In seven playoff games, McFarland scored two goals and seven points.

University hockey

Acadia Axemen (2006–2010)
McFarland joined the Acadia Axemen of the Atlantic University Sport for the 2006–07 season. In his first season with the club, McFarland scored six goals and 19 points in 28 games. In two playoff games, McFarland earned an assist.

McFarland was named captain of the Axemen in his second season with the club. In 2007–08, McFarland scored eight goals and 25 points in 28 games, leading the team in scoring. In the post-season, he was limited to no points in two games.

In his third season with the Axemen in 2008–09, McFarland remained the captain of the club, as he scored seven goals and 15 points in 28 games. In the playoffs, McFarland scored a goal and four points in five games.

In his final season with Acadia in 2009–10, McFarland continued his captaincy duties. In 28 games, he scored four goals and 15 points. In the post-season, McFarland earned an assist in four games.

Regular season and playoffs

Coaching career

Oshawa Generals (2012–2014)
McFarland joined the Oshawa Generals on the Ontario Hockey League (OHL) as an assistant coach, working under the newly-hired head coach D.J. Smith. In his first season with the club in 2012–13, the Generals finished in third place in the Eastern Conference with a 42–22–1–3 record, earning 88 points. In the post-season, the Generals defeated the Niagara IceDogs in the conference quarter-finals, however, the club was swept by the Barrie Colts in the conference semi-finals.

In 2013–14, the Generals finished in first place in the Eastern Conference, as the club had a record of 42–20–0–6, earning 90 points. In the playoffs, Oshawa swept the Mississauga Steelheads in the conference quarter-finals, swept the Peterborough Petes in the conference semi-finals, and then were swept by the North Bay Battalion in a four games.

Following the season, McFarland resigned as the assistant coach of the club.

Kingston Frontenacs (2014–2017)
On May 20, 2014, the OHL's Kingston Frontenacs announced McFarland as their new head coach. On September 25, 2014, McFarland coached his first career game, as the Frontenacs defeated the Peterborough Petes 5–3. In his first season with the Frontenacs in 2014–15, he led the club to a 32–28–5–3 record, earning 72 points and sixth place in the Eastern Conference. On March 27, McFarland coached in his first playoff game, as the North Bay Battalion defeated the Frontenacs 8–0. The Frontenacs lost in the conference quarter-finals against the Battalion, as they were swept in four games.

The Frontenacs finished on top of the Eastern Conference in McFarland's second season with the club in 2015–16. Kingston set a franchise record for points in a season, as the club earned a 46–17–3–2 record, earning 97 points. In the conference quarter-finals, the Frontenacs defeated the Oshawa Generals in five games, which was the first time since 1998 that the club had won a playoff round. In the conference semi-finals, Kingston was upset by the Niagara IceDogs, as they lost in a four-game sweep.

Despite losing a number of top players to graduation, the Frontenacs remained competitive during the 2016–17 season. Kingston finished the season in fourth place in the Eastern Conference with a 33-26-5-4 record, earning 75 points. In the conference quarter-finals, the Frontenacs defeated the Hamilton Bulldogs in a thrilling seven game series, as Kingston won game seven in overtime. In the conference semi-finals, the club was swept by the Peterborough Petes in four games.

Following the season, McFarland resigned from his position with the Frontenacs.

Florida Panthers (2017–2019)
McFarland joined the Florida Panthers coaching staff as an assistant coach, working with newly hired head coach Bob Boughner. In 2017–18, the Panthers missed the post-season by one point, as the club had a record of 44–30–8, earning 96 points and finishing in ninth place in the Eastern Conference, a 15-point improvement for the club from the previous season.

The Panthers slumped to a 36–32–14 record in the 2018–19 season, as they earned 86 points, dropping them to tenth place in the Eastern Conference. Following the season, Boughner and McFarland were relieved from their duties.

Toronto Maple Leafs (2019–2020)
On May 23, 2019, the Toronto Maple Leafs announced that McFarland was hired by the club as an assistant coach, working with head coach Mike Babcock. After the Leafs had a slow start to the 2019–20 season, the club fired head coach Mike Babcock and named Sheldon Keefe as head coach. McFarland remained with Toronto during this time.

On May 8, 2020, McFarland announced that he would be resigning as an assistant coach with the Maple Leafs at the end of the season. The Leafs season concluded on August 9, 2020, after the club lost to the Columbus Blue Jackets in five games in the Eastern Conference qualifying round.

Kingston Frontenacs (2020–2021)
On May 8, 2020, the Kingston Frontenacs announced that McFarland was returning as head coach of the team after previously coaching the team from 2014 to 2017. On August 18, 2020, the Frontenacs announced that McFarland was also named the general manager of the club. However, the 2020–21 OHL season was entirely cancelled due the effects of the COVID-19 pandemic and McFarland left the team for an assistant coaching position with the NHL's new expansion team, the Seattle Kraken, without coaching a game in his second term in Kingston.

Seattle Kraken (2021-pres)
On July 6, 2021, McFarland was named an assistant coach for the Seattle Kraken, working under head coach Dave Hakstol, for the inaugural season of the franchise.

Coaching record

References

 

1985 births
Acadia Axemen ice hockey players
Canadian ice hockey coaches
Florida Panthers coaches
Kingston Frontenacs coaches
Kitchener Rangers players
Living people
People from Richmond Hill, Ontario
Seattle Kraken coaches
Toronto Maple Leafs coaches
Windsor Spitfires players